2018 Sarpol-e Zahab earthquake (زمین‌لرزه ۱۳۹۷ سرپل ذهاب) with magnitude 6.3 earthquake struck western Iran near its border with Iraq at 20:07 local time (19:37 local time in Iraq) on Sunday night, 25 November 2018 injuring over 700 people and sending fearful residents running into the street. One fatality and 45 injuries were also reported in the neighbouring Iraq. According to CNN, some houses were destroyed in several rural areas of Qasr-e-Shirin and SarPol-e zahab. As soon as the quake stopped, several rescue teams were quickly dispatched, the authorities said.

The tremor was also felt in the Iraqi capital Baghdad and in Kuwait. It was also experienced in Erbil, in the region of Kurdistan, according to Al Jazeera.

See also
 List of earthquakes in Iran
2017 Iran–Iraq earthquake

References

External links
 

2018 earthquakes
2018 in Iran
2018 in Iraq
Earthquakes in Iran
Earthquakes in Iraq
November 2018 events in Iran
November 2018 events in Iraq